The Independence Medal was instituted by the President of the Republic of Venda in 1979, for award to all ranks in commemoration of the independence of Venda.

The Venda Defence Force
The 900 member Venda Defence Force (VDF) was established upon that country's independence on 13 September 1979. The Republic of Venda ceased to exist on 27 April 1994 and the Venda Defence Force was amalgamated with six other military forces into the South African National Defence Force (SANDF).

Institution
The Independence Medal was instituted by the President of Venda in 1979.

Award criteria
The medal was awarded to all ranks in commemoration of the independence of Venda.

Order of wear

Since the Independence Medal was authorised for wear by one of the statutory forces which came to be part of the South African National Defence Force on 27 April 1994, it was accorded a position in the official South African order of precedence on that date.

Venda Defence Force until 26 April 1994
  
Official VDF order of precedence:
 Preceded by the General Service Medal.
 Succeeded by the Long Service Medal, Gold.
Venda official national order of precedence:
 Preceded by the Police Medal for Combating Terrorism.
 Succeeded by the Police Establishment Medal.

South African National Defence Force from 27 April 1994
  
Official SANDF order of precedence:
 Preceded by the Independence Medal of the Republic of Bophuthatswana.
 Succeeded by the Independence Medal of the Republic of Ciskei.
Official national order of precedence:
 Preceded by the Independence Police Medal of the Republic of Bophuthatswana.
 Succeeded by the Police Establishment Medal of the KwaZulu Homeland.

The position of the Independence Medal in the official order of precedence was revised twice after 1994, to accommodate the inclusion or institution of new decorations and medals, first in April 1996 when decorations and medals were belatedly instituted for the two former non-statutory forces, the Azanian People's Liberation Army and Umkhonto we Sizwe, and again upon the institution of a new set of honours on 27 April 2003, but it remained unchanged on both occasions.

Description
Obverse
The Independence Medal is a medallion struck in copper, 38 millimetres in diameter, depicting an elephant's head on a shield and inscribed "13 9 1979" above, "INDEPENDENCE" to the left and "DUVHA LA VHUDILANG" to the right of the shield.

Reverse
The reverse displays the Coat of Arms of the Republic of Venda.

Ribbon
The ribbon is 32 millimetres wide, with a 5 millimetres wide brown band, a 2 millimetres wide yellow band, a 5 millimetres wide green band and a 1 millimetre wide yellow band, repeated in reverse order and separated by a 6 millimetres wide blue band.

Discontinuation
Conferment of the Independence Medal was discontinued when the Republic of Venda ceased to exist on 27 April 1994.

References

Military decorations and medals of Venda
Awards established in 1979